"Prayer for the Dying" is a song by British musician Seal and Augustus Lundell "Gus" Isidore. It was released on 9 May 1994 as the lead single from his second studio album, Seal (also known as Seal II) (1994), reaching number 14 on the UK Singles Chart and number 21 on the US Billboard Hot 100. In Canada, it became Seal's first of three songs to peak at number two on the RPM Top Singles chart, becoming his joint highest-charting single in Canada. In November 1995, "Prayer for the Dying" was reissued as a double A-side with "Don't Cry" in the UK; this release reached number 51 on the UK chart.

Critical reception
Troy J. Augusto from Cash Box described the song as a "sultry, smooth-as-silk mid-tempo number". He added, "One of those rare tracks that will work at top 40, rock and adult formats, “Prayer for the Dying” sports a captivating bass line, a nifty, head-bobbing rhythm structure and Seal’s wonderful, unique vocals. His prayers, it seems, are about to be answered." In his weekly UK chart commentary, James Masterton wrote that the singer "is back with another stunning piece of music, casting aside much of the electronics that characterised his debut album, still with Trevor Horn at the controls though and an instant chart smash." 

Alan Jones from Music Week gave the song three out of five and named it Pick of the Week, saying, "After a slow start, this builds nicely into an edgy and convincing comeback, with a swirl of sound dominated by that familiar and perfectly measured voice." David Sinclair from The Times viewed it as "a mature soul ballad with a sinuous funk beat." He explained further, "Couched in a typically lush and large production by Trevor Horn, Seal's message is a spiritual tour de force about crossing bridges, walking on water and life going on, regardless. Rock meets soul to produce a smooth song with a big heart."

Music video
A music video was made to accompany the song, directed by Scottish director Paul Boyd.The video begins with Seal standing in a dark, empty room with multiple doors in the white background. As Seal starts to sing he is then shown from different angles throughout the video in the now brighly lit room.

Track listings

 UK CD1 and Australian CD single 
 "Prayer for the Dying" – 4:16
 "Dreaming in Metaphors" (piano version) – 5:02
 "Prayer for the Dying" (instrumental) – 4:15
 "Crazy" (acoustic version) – 3:31

 UK CD2 
 "Prayer for the Dying" – 4:15
 "Prayer for the Dying" (Eren/Ollie Mix) – 4:57
 "Prayer for the Dying" (Psalm dub) – 6:37

 UK 7-inch and cassette single 
 US CD and cassette single 
 "Prayer for the Dying" – 4:15 (4:16 on UK 7-inch)
 "Dreaming in Metaphors" (piano version) – 5:02

 US 7-inch single 
A. "Prayer for the Dying" (album version) – 5:28
B. "Prayer for the Dying" (Divine Spirit Mix) – 4:34

Charts

Weekly charts

Year-end charts

References

1994 singles
1994 songs
1995 singles
Music videos directed by Paul Boyd
Seal (musician) songs
Song recordings produced by Trevor Horn
Songs written by Seal (musician)
ZTT Records singles